The following radio stations broadcast on AM frequency 800 kHz: 800 AM is a Mexican clear-channel frequency.  XEROK Ciudad Juárez, Mexico, is the dominant station on 800 AM. See also List of broadcast station classes.

In Argentina 
 LT43 in Charata, Chaco
 LU15 in Viedma, Río Negro
 LV23 in General Alvear, Mendoza
 Wajzugun in San Martín de los Andes, Neuquén

In Canada

In Caribbean Netherlands 
 PJB3 in Kralendijk, Bonaire

In Mexico 
Stations in bold are clear-channel stations.
 XEAN-AM in Ocotlán, Jalisco
 XEERG-AM in Ojo de Agua, Nuevo León
 XEQT-AM in Veracruz, Veracruz
 XEROK-AM in Ciudad Juárez, Chihuahua - 50 kW, transmitter located at 
 XESPN-AM in Tijuana, Baja California
 XEZV-AM in Tlapa de Comonfort, Guerrero

In the United States

References

Lists of radio stations by frequency